The Aniversario de Arena México (Spanish for "Arena México Anniversary") show is an annual major professional wrestling show produced by Consejo Mundial de Lucha Libre (CMLL) to commemorate the opening of Arena México, the promotion's main venue, in 1956. The event usually takes place in April with very few exceptions in place of the promotion's regular Friday Night Super Viernes series of shows. Detailed results of a number of older events have not been found and in some cases no results or planned matches have been found documented, leading only to the knowledge that an event probably took place, but no confirmation of date or other details were found. The most recent show was the 63. Aniversario de Arena México show that took place on April 26, 2019. Up until 1991 CMLL operated under the name Empresa Mexicana de Lucha Libre (EMLL) or some times as NWA-EMLL, to promote their association with the National Wrestling Alliance (NWA) that ended in 1991 and prompted the name change.

Events and dates

9. Aniversario de Arena México

The 9. Aniversario de Arena México (Spanish for "Arena México 9th Anniversary") show was a major professional wrestling show produced by Empresa Mexicana de Lucha Libre (EMLL) to commemorate the opening of Arena México, the promotion's main venue, in 1956. The event took place on April 3, 1965, as part of a special Friday Night Super Viernes series of shows.

Results

12. Aniversario de Arena México

The 12. Aniversario de Arena México (Spanish for "Arena México 12th Anniversary") show was a major professional wrestling show produced by Empresa Mexicana de Lucha Libre (EMLL) to commemorate the opening of Arena México, the promotion's main venue, in 1956. The event took place on April 26, 1968, as part of a special Friday Night Super Viernes series of shows.

Results

13. Aniversario de Arena México

The 13. Aniversario de Arena México (Spanish for "Arena México 12th Anniversary") show was a major professional wrestling show produced by Empresa Mexicana de Lucha Libre (EMLL) to commemorate the opening of Arena México, the promotion's main venue, in 1956. The event took place on April 18, 1969, as part of a special Friday Night Super Viernes series of shows.

Results

14. Aniversario de Arena México

The 14. Aniversario de Arena México (Spanish for "Arena México 14th Anniversary") show was a major professional wrestling show produced by Empresa Mexicana de Lucha Libre (EMLL) to commemorate the opening of Arena México, the promotion's main venue, in 1956. The event took place on April 24, 1970, as part of a special Friday Night Super Viernes series of shows.

Results

16. Aniversario de Arena México

The 16. Aniversario de Arena México (Spanish for "Arena México 16th Anniversary") show was a major professional wrestling show produced by Empresa Mexicana de Lucha Libre (EMLL) to commemorate the opening of Arena México, the promotion's main venue, in 1956. The event took place on April 21, 1972, as part of a special Friday Night Super Viernes series of shows.

Results

18. Aniversario de Arena México

The 18. Aniversario de Arena México (Spanish for "Arena México 18th Anniversary") show was a major professional wrestling show produced by Empresa Mexicana de Lucha Libre (EMLL) to commemorate the opening of Arena México, the promotion's main venue, in 1956. The event took place on April 24, 1974, as part of a special Friday Night Super Viernes series of shows.

Results

19. Aniversario de Arena México

The 19. Aniversario de Arena México (Spanish for "Arena México 19th Anniversary") show was a major professional wrestling show produced by Empresa Mexicana de Lucha Libre (EMLL) to commemorate the opening of Arena México, the promotion's main venue, in 1956. The event took place on May 25, 1975, as part of a special Friday Night Super Viernes series of shows. The 19. Anniversario show was one of the few Aniversario shows not held in April.

Results

20. Aniversario de Arena México

The 20. Aniversario de Arena México (Spanish for "Arena México 20th Anniversary") show was a major professional wrestling show produced by Empresa Mexicana de Lucha Libre (EMLL) to commemorate the opening of Arena México, the promotion's main venue, in 1956. The event took place on April 23, 1976, as part of a special Friday Night Super Viernes series of shows.

Results

21. Aniversario de Arena México

The 20. Aniversario de Arena México (Spanish for "Arena México 20th Anniversary") show was a major professional wrestling show produced by Empresa Mexicana de Lucha Libre (EMLL) to commemorate the opening of Arena México, the promotion's main venue, in 1956. The event took place on April 21, 1977, as part of a special Friday Night Super Viernes series of shows.

Results

22. Aniversario de Arena México

The 22. Aniversario de Arena México (Spanish for "Arena México 22nd Anniversary") show was a major professional wrestling show produced by Empresa Mexicana de Lucha Libre (EMLL) to commemorate the opening of Arena México, the promotion's main venue, in 1956. The event took place on April 21, 1978, as part of a special Friday Night Super Viernes series of shows.

Results

23. Aniversario de Arena México

The 23. Aniversario de Arena México (Spanish for "Arena México 23rd Anniversary") show was a major professional wrestling show produced by Empresa Mexicana de Lucha Libre (EMLL) to commemorate the opening of Arena México, the promotion's main venue, in 1956. The event took place on April 21, 1979, as part of a special Friday Night Super Viernes series of shows.

Results

24. Aniversario de Arena México

The 24. Aniversario de Arena México (Spanish for "Arena México 24th Anniversary") show was a major professional wrestling show produced by Empresa Mexicana de Lucha Libre (EMLL) to commemorate the opening of Arena México, the promotion's main venue, in 1956. The event took place on April 4, 1980, as part of a special Friday Night Super Viernes series of shows.

Results

25. Aniversario de Arena México

The 25. Aniversario de Arena México (Spanish for "Arena México 25th Anniversary") show was a major professional wrestling show produced by Empresa Mexicana de Lucha Libre (EMLL) to commemorate the opening of Arena México, the promotion's main venue, in 1956. The event took place on April 3, 1981, as part of a special Friday Night Super Viernes series of shows.

Results

26. Aniversario de Arena México

The 26. Aniversario de Arena México (Spanish for "Arena México 26th Anniversary") show was a major professional wrestling show produced by Empresa Mexicana de Lucha Libre (EMLL) to commemorate the opening of Arena México, the promotion's main venue, in 1956. The event took place on April 2, 1982, as part of a special Friday Night Super Viernes series of shows.

Results

27. Aniversario de Arena México

The 27. Aniversario de Arena México (Spanish for "Arena México 27th Anniversary") show was a major professional wrestling show produced by Empresa Mexicana de Lucha Libre (EMLL) to commemorate the opening of Arena México, the promotion's main venue, in 1956. The event took place on April 22, 1983, as part of a special Friday Night Super Viernes series of shows.

Results

28. Aniversario de Arena México

The 28. Aniversario de Arena México (Spanish for "Arena México 28th Anniversary") show was a major professional wrestling show produced by Empresa Mexicana de Lucha Libre (EMLL) to commemorate the opening of Arena México, the promotion's main venue, in 1956. The event took place on April 8, 1984, as part of a special Friday Night Super Viernes series of shows.

Results

29. Aniversario de Arena México

The 29. Aniversario de Arena México (Spanish for "Arena México 29th Anniversary") show was a major professional wrestling show produced by Empresa Mexicana de Lucha Libre (EMLL) to commemorate the opening of Arena México, the promotion's main venue, in 1956. The event took place on April 5, 1985, as part of a special Friday Night Super Viernes series of shows.

Results

31. Aniversario de Arena México

The 31. Aniversario de Arena México (Spanish for "Arena México 31st Anniversary") show was a major professional wrestling show produced by Empresa Mexicana de Lucha Libre (EMLL) to commemorate the opening of Arena México, the promotion's main venue, in 1956. The event took place on April 12, 1987, as part of a special Friday Night Super Viernes series of shows.

Results

33. Aniversario de Arena México

The 33. Aniversario de Arena México (Spanish for "Arena México 33rd Anniversary") show was a major professional wrestling show produced by Empresa Mexicana de Lucha Libre (EMLL) to commemorate the opening of Arena México, the promotion's main venue, in 1956. The event took place on April 28, 1989, as part of a special Friday Night Super Viernes series of shows.

Results

36. Aniversario de Arena México

The 36. Aniversario de Arena México (Spanish for "Arena México 36th Anniversary") show was a major professional wrestling show produced by Consejo Mundial de Lucha Libre (CMLL) to commemorate the opening of Arena México, the promotion's main venue, in 1956. The event took place on April 3, 1992, as part of a special Friday Night Super Viernes series of shows. The 36. Aniversario show was the first Arena México Aniversario show promoted under the CMLL name, having previously used the name "Empresa Mexicana de Lucha Libre" (EMLL).

Results

37. Aniversario de Arena México

The 37. Aniversario de Arena México (Spanish for "Arena México 37th Anniversary") show was a major professional wrestling show produced by Consejo Mundial de Lucha Libre (CMLL) to commemorate the opening of Arena México, the promotion's main venue, in 1956. The event took place on April 2, 1993, as part of a special Friday Night Super Viernes series of shows. The 36. Aniversario show was the first Arena México Aniversario show promoted under the CMLL name, having previously used the name "Empresa Mexicana de Lucha Libre" (EMLL).

Results

39. Aniversario de Arena México

The 39. Aniversario de Arena México (Spanish for "Arena México 39th Anniversary") show was a major professional wrestling show produced by Consejo Mundial de Lucha Libre (CMLL) to commemorate the opening of Arena México, the promotion's main venue, in 1956. The event took place on April 7, 1995, as part of a special Friday Night Super Viernes series of shows.

Results

40. Aniversario de Arena México

The 40. Aniversario de Arena México (Spanish for "Arena México 40th Anniversary") show was a major professional wrestling show produced by Consejo Mundial de Lucha Libre (CMLL) to commemorate the opening of Arena México, the promotion's main venue, in 1956. The event took place on April 19, 1996, as part of a special Friday Night Super Viernes series of shows.

Results

41. Aniversario de Arena México

The 41. Aniversario de Arena México (Spanish for "Arena México 41st Anniversary") show was a major professional wrestling show produced by Consejo Mundial de Lucha Libre (CMLL) to commemorate the opening of Arena México, the promotion's main venue, in 1956. The event took place on April 18, 1997, as part of a special Friday Night Super Viernes series of shows.

Results

42. Aniversario de Arena México

The 42. Aniversario de Arena México (Spanish for "Arena México 42nd Anniversary") show was a major professional wrestling show produced by Consejo Mundial de Lucha Libre (CMLL) to commemorate the opening of Arena México, the promotion's main venue, in 1956. The event took place on April 24, 1998, as part of a special Friday Night Super Viernes series of shows.

Results

43. Aniversario de Arena México

The 43. Aniversario de Arena México (Spanish for "Arena México 42nd Anniversary") show was a major professional wrestling show produced by Consejo Mundial de Lucha Libre (CMLL) to commemorate the opening of Arena México, the promotion's main venue, in 1956. The event took place on April 2, 1999, as part of a special Friday Night Super Viernes series of shows.

Results

44. Aniversario de Arena México

The 44. Aniversario de Arena México (Spanish for "Arena México 44th Anniversary") show was a major professional wrestling show produced by Consejo Mundial de Lucha Libre (CMLL) to commemorate the opening of Arena México, the promotion's main venue, in 1956. The event took place on April 14, 2000, as part of a special Friday Night Super Viernes series of shows.

Results

45. Aniversario de Arena México

The 45. Aniversario de Arena México (Spanish for "Arena México 45th Anniversary") show was a major professional wrestling show produced by Consejo Mundial de Lucha Libre (CMLL) to commemorate the opening of Arena México, the promotion's main venue, in 1956. The event took place on April 13, 2001, as part of a special Friday Night Super Viernes series of shows.

Results

46. Aniversario de Arena México

The 46. Aniversario de Arena México (Spanish for "Arena México 46th Anniversary") show was a major professional wrestling show produced by Consejo Mundial de Lucha Libre (CMLL) to commemorate the opening of Arena México, the promotion's main venue, in 1956. The event took place on April 12, 2002, as part of a special Friday Night Super Viernes series of shows.

Results

47. Aniversario de Arena México

The 47. Aniversario de Arena México (Spanish for "Arena México 47th Anniversary") show was a major professional wrestling show produced by Consejo Mundial de Lucha Libre (CMLL) to commemorate the opening of Arena México, the promotion's main venue, in 1956. The event took place on April 4, 2003, as part of a special Friday Night Super Viernes series of shows.

Results

48. Aniversario de Arena México

The 48. Aniversario de Arena México (Spanish for "Arena México 48th Anniversary") show was a major professional wrestling show produced by Consejo Mundial de Lucha Libre (CMLL) to commemorate the opening of Arena México, the promotion's main venue, in 1956. The event took place on April 30, 2004, as part of a special Friday Night Super Viernes series of shows.

Results

49. Aniversario de Arena México

The 49. Aniversario de Arena México (Spanish for "Arena México 49th Anniversary") show was a major professional wrestling show produced by Consejo Mundial de Lucha Libre (CMLL) to commemorate the opening of Arena México, the promotion's main venue, in 1956. The event took place on April 8, 2005, as part of a special Friday Night Super Viernes series of shows.

Results

50. Aniversario de Arena México

The 50. Aniversario de Arena México (Spanish for "Arena México 50th Anniversary") show was a major professional wrestling show produced by Consejo Mundial de Lucha Libre (CMLL) to commemorate the opening of Arena México, the promotion's main venue, in 1956. The event took place on April 28, 2006, as part of a special Friday Night Super Viernes series of shows.

Results

51. Aniversario de Arena México

The 51. Aniversario de Arena México (Spanish for "Arena México 51st Anniversary") show was a major professional wrestling show produced by Consejo Mundial de Lucha Libre (CMLL) to commemorate the opening of Arena México, the promotion's main venue, in 1956. The event took place on April 13, 2007, as part of a special Friday Night Super Viernes series of shows.

Results

52. Aniversario de Arena México

The 52. Aniversario de Arena México (Spanish for "Arena México 52nd Anniversary") show was a major professional wrestling show produced by Consejo Mundial de Lucha Libre (CMLL) to commemorate the opening of Arena México, the promotion's main venue, in 1956. The event took place on April 18, 2008, as part of a special Friday Night Super Viernes series of shows.

Results

53. Aniversario de Arena México

The 53. Aniversario de Arena México (Spanish for "Arena México 53rd Anniversary") show was a major professional wrestling show produced by Consejo Mundial de Lucha Libre (CMLL) to commemorate the opening of Arena México, the promotion's main venue, in 1956. The event took place on April 12, 2009.

Results

54. Aniversario de Arena México

The 54. Aniversario de Arena México (Spanish for "Arena México 54th Anniversary") show was a major professional wrestling show produced by Consejo Mundial de Lucha Libre (CMLL) to commemorate the opening of Arena México, the promotion's main venue, in 1956. The event took place on April 16, 2010, as part of a special Friday Night Super Viernes series of shows.

Results

55. Aniversario de Arena México

The 55. Aniversario de Arena México (Spanish for "Arena México 55th Anniversary") show was a major professional wrestling show produced by Consejo Mundial de Lucha Libre (CMLL) to commemorate the opening of Arena México, the promotion's main venue, in 1956. The event took place on April 29, 2011, as part of a special Friday Night Super Viernes series of shows.

Results

56. Aniversario de Arena México

The 56. Aniversario de Arena México (Spanish for "Arena México 56th Anniversary") show was a major professional wrestling show produced by Consejo Mundial de Lucha Libre (CMLL) to commemorate the opening of Arena México, the promotion's main venue, in 1956. The event took place on April 27, 2012, as part of a special Friday Night Super Viernes series of shows.

Results

57. Aniversario de Arena México

58. Aniversario de Arena México

The 58. Aniversario de Arena México (Spanish for "Arena México 58th Anniversary") show was a major professional wrestling show produced by Consejo Mundial de Lucha Libre (CMLL) to commemorate the opening of Arena México, the promotion's main venue, in 1956. The event took place on April 27, 2014, as part of a special Friday Night Super Viernes series of shows.

Results

59. Aniversario de Arena México

The 59. Aniversario de Arena México (Spanish for "Arena México 59th Anniversary") show was a major professional wrestling show produced by Consejo Mundial de Lucha Libre (CMLL) to commemorate the opening of Arena México, the promotion's main venue, in 1956. The event took place on April 26, 2015, and featured six matches in total. As part of the show the team known as Los Reyes de la Atlantida ("The Kings of Atlantis"; Atlantis, Delta and Guerrero Maya Jr.) defeated the reigning Mexican National Trios Champions La Peste Negra ("The Black Plague"; Negro Casas, El Felino and Mr. Niebla) to win the championship for the third time, becoming the 38th overall champions.

Results

60. Aniversario de Arena México

61. Aniversario de Arena México

The 61. Aniversario de Arena México (Spanish for "Arena México 61st Anniversary") show was a major professional wrestling show produced by Consejo Mundial de Lucha Libre (CMLL) to commemorate the opening of Arena México, the promotion's main venue, in 1956. The event took place on April 28, 2017, and featured six matches in total. The main event was a best two-out-of-three falls Singles match where La Máscara defeated Volador Jr., after which wrestlers and officials paid homage to La Máscara's father, Brazo de Oro, who died earlier in the day. The other feature match on the show was the finals of the 2017 La Copa Junior tournament, where Soberano Jr. (son of Euforia) defeated Sansón (son of Cien Caras) to win the tournament. The show included four additional mathes

Results

62. Aniversario de Arena México

The 62. Aniversario de Arena México (Spanish for "Arena México 62nd Anniversary") show was a major professional wrestling show produced by Consejo Mundial de Lucha Libre (CMLL) to commemorate the opening of Arena México, the promotion's main venue, in 1956. The event took place on April 27, 2018, and featured six matches in total, including a Lucha de Apuestas, or bet match, where both female competitors put their hair on the line in the match. In the end Princesa Sugehit won and La Seductora was forced to have all her hair shaved off.

Results

63. Aniversario de Arena México

The 63. Aniversario de Arena México (Spanish for "Arena México 63rd Anniversary") show was a major professional wrestling show produced by Consejo Mundial de Lucha Libre (CMLL) to commemorate the opening of Arena México, the promotion's main venue, in 1956. The event took place on April 26, 2019, and featured six matches in total.

Results

64. Aniversario de Arena México
Due to the COVID-19 pandemic, CMLL cancelled all their shows after March 13, 2020 including all shows in April or May. It has not been announced if CMLL would hold a 64th Anniversary Show once they resume normal operations.

65. Aniversario de Arena México

The 65. Aniversario de Arena México (Spanish for "Arena México 65th Anniversary") show was a major professional wrestling show produced by Consejo Mundial de Lucha Libre (CMLL) to commemorate the opening of Arena México, the promotion's main venue, in 1956. The event took place on April 24, 2021, and featured five matches in total.

Results

References